Mieczysław Czajkowski (4 September 1898 – 8 September 1972) was a Polish footballer. He played in two matches for the Poland national football team in 1925.

References

External links
 

1898 births
1972 deaths
Polish footballers
Poland international footballers
Footballers from Łódź
Association football defenders
Polonia Warsaw players